The Other Side of Benny Golson is the third album by saxophonist Benny Golson featuring performances recorded in late 1958 and originally released on the Riverside label.

Reception

Scott Yanow of Allmusic says, "Tenor-saxophonist Benny Golson's third recording as a leader was significant in two ways. It was his first opportunity to work with trombonist Curtis Fuller (the two would be members of The Jazztet by 1960) and it was one of his first chances to really stretch out on record as a soloist; up to this point Golson was possibly better known as a composer".

Track listing
All compositions by Benny Golson except as indicated
 "Strut Time" - 6:03     
 "Jubilation" (Junior Mance) - 6:18     
 "Symptoms" (Curtis Fuller) - 5:58     
 "Are You Real?" - 5:37     
 "Cry a Blue Tear" - 5:20     
 "This Night" (Richard Evans) - 7:50

Personnel
Benny Golson - tenor saxophone
Curtis Fuller - trombone  
Barry Harris - piano
Jymie Merritt - bass
Philly Joe Jones - drums

References 

Riverside Records albums
Benny Golson albums
1958 albums
Albums produced by Orrin Keepnews